Adrien Lemaire (23 October 1852, in Senones – 23 October 1902, in Nancy) was a French botanist.

He received his medical doctorate in March 1882 and his degree in natural sciences in July 1886. In 1887 he became a professor of natural history at the Lycée in Nancy, and in 1894 was appointed chargé de conférences of botany at the University of Nancy. Lemaire was a member of the Société botanique de France.

Published works 
 Catalogue des Diatomées des environs de Nancy, 1881 – Catalog of diatoms found in the environs of Nancy.
 De la détermination histologique des feuilles médicinales 1882 – On the histological determination of medicinal leaves.  
 Recherches sur l'origine et le développement des racines latérales chez les dicotylédones, 1886 – Research on the origin and development of lateral roots in dicotyledons.
 Sur deux nouveaux colorants applicables à l'étude des méristèmes, 1894 – On two new applicable colorants from a study on meristems.

References 

1852 births
1902 deaths
People from Vosges (department)
Academic staff of Nancy-Université
19th-century French botanists